Boquila is a monotypic genus of flowering plants in the family Lardizabalaceae, native to temperate forests of central and southern Chile and Argentina.  The sole species is Boquila trifoliolata (DC.) Decne., called pilpil, voqui, voquicillo, voquillo, and voqui blanco in Chile.  It grows vines that wrap around host plants, mimicking the host's leaves in a phenomenon called mimetic polymorphism. It bears an edible fruit (Boquila berries).

This species has been shown to be capable of mimicking the leaves of its supporting trees. 

Ernesto Gianoli said "Boquila's leaves are extraordinarily diverse. The biggest ones can be 10 times bigger than the smallest, and they can vary from very light to very dark. In around three-quarters of cases, they are similar to the closest leaf from another tree, matching it in size, area, length of stalk, angle, and color. Boquila's leaves can even grow a spiny tip when, and only when, it climbs onto a shrub with spine-tipped leaves."  When there are no nearby host leaves to influence them, the normal leaves of B. trifoliolata are relatively short and light green with rounded edges.

Boquila, unlike other plants capable of mimicry, does not require physical contact to match its host.

Mimicry
Boquila trifoliolata is unique because of the ability of its leaves to mimic those of the hosts that are supporting them, a phenomenon called mimetic polymorphism. This plant's climbing behavior  protects it from ground-dwelling herbivores, and leaf mimicry is a protection against leaf herbivores. B. trifoliolata differs from  other plants that can mimic a host, like the Australian mistletoe, because it is not limited to mimicking a single host and because it is not a parasite to the host tree. An individual B. trifoliolata vine can mimic multiple kinds of foliage that are closest in proximity to it.

Their mimicking behavior was discovered by researchers Ernesto Gianoli and Fernando Carrasco-Urra. They carried out observations and measurements in a rainforest located at Puyehue National Park in southern Chile. They sampled 12 different species of host trees with 45 total individual B. trifoliolata vines that had climbed these trees. The two closest leaves in proximity between a pair of the 45-vine trees were measured, 11 different traits in total: angle, thickness, petiole length, leaflet petiole length, leaflet angle, maximum width, maximum length, area, perimeter, area/perimeter, and color. Usage of a generalized linear model showed that 9 of the 11 traits demonstrated mimicry by the vine to its host tree. Gianoli et al. also sampled more individuals that were prostrated, that grew on leafless tree trunks, and more individuals that have climbed on the 8 most common host species. To analyze these samples, the researchers used multivariate analysis of variance (MANOVA). They found that the prostrate individuals were not different from the leafless-host vines, but that they were different for 7 of the 8 common-host vine leaves. They also concluded that the leafless-host vines were different for 6 of the 8 common-host vines. Moreover, this leaf mimicry served as a protection against leaf herbivores and led to lower leaf herbivory rates. Climbing vines had no difference in herbivory compared to supporting host tree leaves but had much lower herbivory compared to prostrated, unsupported B. trifoliolata individuals. The highest amount of herbivory was on B. trifoliolata vines that climbed onto leafless hosts. 

Currently, there is no known mechanism for how B. trifoliolata is able to mimic host leaves so well, but Gianoli proposes two possible mechanisms. One hypothesis is that volatile organic compounds emitted from host plant leaves induce a phenotypic change in nearby B. trifoliolata leaves. By receiving different host signals into its system, it is able to create specific signals and hormones in its tissues to regulate gene transcription of leaf morphology and developmental pathways for leaf differentiation. The other hypothesis is that there could be horizontal gene transfer between the host and B. trifoliolata. A separate study also conducted by Gianoli et al. suggests that bacterial agents, which could mediate a horizontal gene transfer, may play a role in leaf mimicry by B. trifoliolata. A comparison of endophytic bacterial communities among leaves from a host tree, B. trifoliolata leaves mimicking the host tree leaves, and non-mimetic B. trifoliolata leaves from the same vine revealed that the bacterial communities were more similar among mimetic B. trifoliolata and host leaves than among non-mimetic B. trifoliolata and host leaves.

A 2021 paper suggested that the plant has some sort of vision using ocelli. This hypothesis was presented on the basis of experiments in which the vine appeared to mimic plastic vines and artificial plants. However, the only control used was the lower leaves on the same plants, with an opaque shelf over them which could have influenced light exposure.  The lack of control plants climbing anything apart from the same model of artificial host plant makes it plausible that the observed differences were due to age and light exposure.

See also
 Lardizabala, a related species also grown for its fruit

References

 
 

Lardizabalaceae
Flora of Chile
Monotypic Ranunculales genera
Taxa named by Joseph Decaisne